The New Series Adventures are a series of novels relating to the long-running BBC science fiction television series, Doctor Who. The 'NSAs', as they are often referred to, are published by BBC Books, and are regularly published twice a year. Beginning with the Tenth Doctor, a series of 'Quick Reads' have also been available, published once a year. With exception to the Quick Reads, all of the NSAs have been published in hardcover to begin with, and have been reprinted in paperback for boxed collections that are exclusive to The Book People and Tesco. Some of the reprints amend pictures of the companion of the novel from the cover. Some of the hardback editions have also been reprinted to amend pictures of Rose.

Publication history

Ninth Doctor novels
With the revival of the television series, BBC Books retired its paperback Eighth Doctor Adventures and Past Doctor Adventures fiction lines in 2005 in favour of a new range of hardback books featuring the Ninth Doctor and Rose. These have a reduced word count compared to the EDA and PDA lines, with an average page count of about 250. (Initially, the EDA and PDA lines overlapped with the New Series Adventures; the final EDA, The Gallifrey Chronicles, was published in June 2005, followed by the final PDA, Atom Bomb Blues, a Seventh Doctor adventure, being published in December 2005.)

The 2005 series episode "Boom Town" makes a reference to the Doctor and Rose's trip to the Justicia system. This took place in The Monsters Inside, making it the first spin-off novel to ever be explicitly referred to in the television series. All the Ninth Doctor novels except Only Human contain "Bad Wolf" references in common with the 2005 television series.  Winner Takes All also features the recurring characters Mickey Smith and Jackie Tyler; Jackie also makes a cameo appearance in Only Human.

Unlike many of the BBC's earlier spin-off novels, no definite timeframe exists as to when each of the books take place, though the first three probably take place between "World War Three" and "The Empty Child". Of the latter three (which feature Captain Jack), Only Human and The Deviant Strain take place between "The Doctor Dances" and "Boom Town", while The Stealers of Dreams takes place after "Boom Town" as the events of that episode are referenced, although on-screen dialogue in the episode "Bad Wolf" makes it a challenge to place this novel into the show's continuity. However, it is possible that after "Boom Town", the Doctor, Rose and Jack went somewhere else before returning the egg to Raxacoricofallapatorius.

The first books in the series were popular in the UK. In Canada, the books were not carried by the same distributor as the BBC Books paperbacks, and were initially available only through comic book shops and online retailers when Diamond Comic Distributors took up the contract.

During 2005, the New Series Adventures featuring the Ninth Doctor were published concurrently with the paperback Eighth Doctor and Past Doctor Adventures series. However, following the publication of the Past Doctor Adventure Atom Bomb Blues (featuring the Seventh Doctor) in November 2005, no new paperback releases were announced, with BBC Books choosing to focus on the New Series Adventures exclusively as the books moved on to featuring the Tenth Doctor.

Tenth Doctor novels
With the departure of Christopher Eccleston from the role of the Doctor, BBC Books subsequently announced the publication of three novels featuring the Tenth Doctor and Rose, released on 13 April 2006.  These books follow the same style and format as those featuring the Ninth Doctor, with a continuation of the spine numbering. Range consultant and commissioning editor Justin Richards told Doctor Who Magazine that there would be no Ninth Doctor novels in 2006, and the decision as to whether to continue to publish stories with the Ninth Doctor as a separate range has not yet been taken.

Abridged audiobooks were released of all of the Tenth Doctor titles (except the Quick Read series).  The first three are narrated by David Tennant (who plays the Tenth Doctor), and were released on 3 July 2006.  The Nightmare of Black Island (read by Anthony Head), The Art of Destruction (read by Don Warrington), and The Price of Paradise (read by Shaun Dingwall), were released in November 2006.

Four books in the series were released exclusively as paperback novellas under the Quick Reads scheme to inspire literacy among children. One of these novellas, Made of Steel, featured new companion Martha Jones before the character made her television debut ("Smith and Jones"). It was also the first New Series Adventure to be written by Terrance Dicks, a long-time veteran of Doctor Who and former writer for the original series, making him the only writer who has written novels for every line of Doctor Who fiction with the exception of the Telos novellas. Despite the character of Martha Jones having left the television series at the end of the 2007 season (although she subsequently appeared in several episodes of the 2008 season), the novels released in early 2008 continued to feature her as a companion, rather than the Doctor's new companion, Donna Noble.

Donna featured in all three of the novels released in late 2008. The Boxing Day 2008 release saw the series cover new ground with one book featuring Donna Noble, one book covering Martha Jones' adventures between the episodes "The Sound of Drums" (2007) and "Last of the Time Lords" (2007), and one book featuring the Doctor travelling without a companion following the events of "Journey's End" (2008). The 2009 releases (including 6 books in the main series, 1 novella and The Darksmith Legacy) all follow the mould of the Doctor travelling without a regular companion. These books also feature aliens from the New Series. Whilst this is not the first time this has happened (The Monsters Inside), it is the first time they are on the cover, or referenced in the title.

In 2020 BBC Books released two new novels featuring the Tenth Doctor to tie in with the Time Lord Victorious multi-platform storyline. The Eighth and Ninth Doctors also appeared in both books.

Eleventh Doctor novels
The series of Eleventh Doctor novels began in April 2010, with a new cover design, amending the Gallifreyan numbering system on the spine. The titles quickly reached sales numbers of the previous Tenth Doctor novels, and a further batches of three books have been released on a regular basis since July 2010.

In October 2009 Michael Moorcock confirmed that he would be writing a one-off, supersize novel, combining prose with hand-drawn sketches, images and exclusive artwork. The title was confirmed as The Coming of the Terraphiles, and it was released in November 2010. It did not form part of the usual range of novels, and featured characters from Michael Moorcock's Second Ether books.  Two further books followed in the hardback range, The Silent Stars Go By, released in September 2011, and Dark Horizons, the only novel released that year, in July 2012.

In April 2011 BBC Books launched a new range of "chapter books" that offer readers aged 8–12 two stories in one publication (or "2in1", which appears on the books' covers). The first two releases had flippable covers and a divided spine design. In late August 2011 the second batch of releases was published with a surtitle applied to the two stories and a shared cover with a more traditional blurb for each of the two stories on the back of the books. The next batch of 2in1 stories was released in February 2012.

Twelfth Doctor novels
In May 2014, it was revealed that New Series Adventures would release books starring the Twelfth Doctor and Clara Oswald, which were released in September 2014. The titles of the released books are Silhouette, The Crawling Terror, and The Blood Cell. The next wave was released in September 2015, with each book under the name of the Glamour Chronicles. The stories featured were Deep Time, Royal Blood and Big Bang Generation; first two of these feature the Twelfth Doctor and Clara, and the latter marking first New Series Adventure appearance of Bernice Summerfield, alongside the Twelfth Doctor.

A new wave was released in April 2017 with the arrival of Bill Potts and Nardole making a presence to prose. The stories featuring are Diamond Dogs, The Shining Man and Plague City.

Thirteenth Doctor novels
In July 2017, it was revealed that Penguin Random House would publish books featuring the 13th Doctor.

The Good Doctor was released on 25 October 2018.  
Molten Heart was released on 8 November 2018.  
Combat Magicks was released on 22 November 2018.

In 2018, it was announced that author David Solomons would write two novels featuring the 13th Doctor to be published by BBC Children's Books with the first book, The Secret in Vault 13, set to be released on 1 November 2018. The second, The Maze of Doom, was published on 30 April 2020.

In 2020, actress Sophie Aldred released a brand-new novel featuring the 13th Doctor and Ace called At Childhood's End.

Audio stories

Starting with The Stone Rose, all of the New Series Adventures featuring the Tenth Doctor have been released as abridged audio books, normally around three months after the print publication. The first three stories in the range were narrated by David Tennant, with subsequent stories narrated by different members of the cast. In January 2010, it was decided that the stories would be released, unabridged, as download-only exclusives, and that no further stories were to be published on CD. This affected the last five Tenth Doctor novels, and continued with the release of the Eleventh and Twelfth Doctor novels. There has also been a separate range of audio-only stories. These are linked to the novels, but are available on CD and download formats. The range began in July 2008 with Pest Control, and has since contained seven stories featuring the Tenth Doctor, fourteen stories about the Eleventh Doctor, and continue with the Twelfth Doctor.

In August 2011, the Ninth Doctor Adventures started being released as unabridged downloadable audiobooks. The first book was released in August 2011 and the next one will be released in September. It is not known when the following books will be released as audiobooks, but they presumably will at some point.

List of New Series Adventures

Novels

Cancelled novel
 "The Rain of Terror"
 Author: Mike Tucker
 Due Date: 8 September 2005
 Doctor: Ninth
 Companions: Rose Tyler & Captain Jack Harkness
 Information: This was originally due as part of the second selection of Ninth Doctor novels; however, in Doctor Who Magazine #374, author Mike Tucker, revealed that due to a heavy workload, he was unable to make changes to the story that had been requested by the production office, and therefore they decided to drop the story in favour of Steve Lyons' The Stealers of Dreams. The original storyline was later reworked into an Eleventh Doctor book with the same title, as part of the 2in1 line (see below).

Chapter books (2 in 1 series)

Quick Reads

Decide Your Destiny

Choose the Future

Original audiobooks

The Darksmith Legacy

Anthologies
Since 2014 BBC books have published a number of anthologies featuring all The Doctors and various other characters from the TV show, unlike earlier anthology book The Story of Martha these have been put out as special releases separate from the main New Series Adventures range.

Other publications
These books are not part of the New Series Adventures but are still published by BBC Books and feature the ninth, tenth, eleventh and twelfth Doctors.
 The Doctor Who Stories (2009)
 A book containing fourteen stories, with one of each previously appearing in each fourteen volumes of the Doctor Who Files series (published by BBC Children's Books), and another, previously unpublished, story.
 The Weeping Angels (2010)
 A book published by BBC Children's Books containing two new stories and several activity items (such as stickers).
 The Angel's Kiss (2012)
 The story starts slightly before "The Angels Take Manhattan", and reinvents the episode from River Song's point of view. It was released exclusively as an ebook. The story is also available to download in audio form via the BBC website AudioGO.
 Summer Falls (2013)
 A book written by the character Amy Pond and featured in the episode "The Bells of Saint John". It was released exclusively as an ebook. The story is also available to download in audio form via the BBC Website AudioGO.
 The Devil in the Smoke (2013)
 A book featuring the adventures of Madame Vastra, Jenny and Strax, the crime-busting, alien-fighting trio. It was released exclusively as an ebook. The story is also available to download in audio form via the BBC website AudioGO.
 The Official Cookbook (2016)
 Whographica: An infographic guide to space and time (2016)
 The Whoniverse (2016)

Notes

 The Clockwise Man: page 120, The Monsters Inside:  page 136, Winner Takes All:  page 22, The Deviant Strain:  page 162, The Stealers of Dreams:  page 113
 The Story of Martha itself was written by Dan Abnett. However the four short stories that alternate with the main plot were written by David Roden, Steve Lockley and Paul Lewis, Robert Shearman, and Simon Jowett.
 Although the Doctor is not travelling with a TV series companion, the blurb of these books indicates that he has a temporary companion for that story: June in The Slitheen Excursion, Nikki in Judgement of the Judoon, and Emma in The Sontaran Games.

See also
Lists of books based on Doctor Who
List of Torchwood novels and audio books
List of Doctor Who novelists

References

External links

 
Book series introduced in 2005